Nobody Like You may refer to:

 "Nobody Like You", by Itzy from the 2020 EP It'z Me
 "Nobody Like You", by Kaskade from the 2017 EP Redux EP 002
 "Nobody Like You", by Kim Jae-joong from the 2022 album Born Gene
 "Nobody Like You", by Limp Bizkit featuring Jonathan Davis and Scott Weiland, from the 1999 album Significant Other
 "Nobody Like You", by Little Mix from the 2016 album Glory Days
 "Nobody Like You", by Louis the Child featuring Vera Blue, from the 2020 album Here for NowSee also
 Ain't Nobody Like You (disambiguation)
 "Nobody Likes You", a section in the 2004 Green Day song "Homecoming"
 "Nobody Like U", a 2022 song by fictional boy band 4*Town from Disney/Pixar's Turning Red''